Neda Shahsavari (born 21 September 1986 in Kermanshah) is an Iranian table tennis player who qualified to compete in the 2012 Summer Olympics in London. Through qualifying, she became the first Iranian woman to represent Iran in table tennis for the 2012 Olympic Games. She was born in the western city of Kermanshah and she studied physical education at university.

She has also qualified to play in her second olympics, at Rio 2016.

References

Living people
Iranian female table tennis players
Table tennis players at the 2012 Summer Olympics
Table tennis players at the 2016 Summer Olympics
Olympic table tennis players of Iran
Kurdish sportspeople
Table tennis players at the 2014 Asian Games
1986 births
Sportspeople from Kermanshah
Table tennis players at the 2018 Asian Games
Asian Games competitors for Iran
20th-century Iranian women
21st-century Iranian women
Islamic Solidarity Games competitors for Iran